is a Japanese politician and former governor of Yamanashi Prefecture. He was formerly a Democratic Party member of the House of Representatives in the Diet (national legislature). He resigned from the Democratic Party and the Diet in November 2014 so that he could contest the January 2015 Yamanashi Gubernatorial election as an independent. A native of Kōfu and graduate of Tohoku University with a Bachelor of Economics, he worked at the Ministry of Agriculture, Forestry and Fisheries from 1980 to 1995.

References 
 

Members of the House of Representatives (Japan)
Living people
1957 births
Democratic Party of Japan politicians
Tohoku University alumni
Governors of Yamanashi Prefecture
21st-century Japanese politicians